Nonnenbach may refer to:

 Nonnenbach (Ahr), a river of North Rhine-Westphalia, Germany, tributary of the Ahr
 Nonnenbach (Aschaff), a river of Bavaria, Germany, tributary of the Aschaff
 Nonnenbach (Bodensee), a river of Baden-Württemberg and Bavaria, Germany, tributary of Lake Constance
 Nonne (river), also called Nonnenbach, a river of Mecklenburg-Vorpommern, Germany, tributary of the Tollensesee